Jernej Molan Barracks (Slovenian: Vojašnica Jerneja Molana), also known as the barracks at Cerklje ob Krki Krka, is a  barracks of the Slovenian Armed Forces, which it is located in Cerklje ob Krki, Slovenia.

In the context of a military barracks acting as at Cerklje ob Krki, which is the largest military airport in Slovenia. Together constitute the Cerklje ob Krki Airbase.

The units that are housed in Barracks

4th light self-propelled air defense battery of the Slovenian Armed Forces
9th Air Defense Battalion of the Slovenian Armed Forces
Learning Center of logistics of the Slovenian Armed Forces

Barracks in Slovenia